Martine Lignières-Cassou (born 22 February 1952) is a French politician who was a member of the National Assembly for 20 years. She represented the 1st constituency in the Pyrénées-Atlantiques department,  and is a member of the Socialist Party and of the Socialiste, radical, citoyen et divers gauche parliamentary group. She was the mayor of Pau, Pyrénées-Atlantiques from 2008 to 2014. In the 1970s she was a member of the Revolutionary Communist League (LCR) before joining the Socialist Party in 1975.

References

1952 births
Living people
People from Algiers
Pieds-Noirs
Revolutionary Communist League (France) politicians
Socialist Party (France) politicians
Mayors of places in Nouvelle-Aquitaine
People from Pau, Pyrénées-Atlantiques
Women mayors of places in France
Women members of the National Assembly (France)
Deputies of the 12th National Assembly of the French Fifth Republic
Deputies of the 13th National Assembly of the French Fifth Republic
Deputies of the 14th National Assembly of the French Fifth Republic
21st-century French women politicians